Yakhno, also transliterated Jachno, is a Ukrainian surname. Notable people with the surname include:

 Andrew Jachno (born 1962), Australian race walker
 Denis Yakhno (born 1992), Belarusian footballer
 Maksym Yakhno (born 1988), Ukrainian footballer
 Yelyzaveta Yakhno (born 1998), Ukrainian synchronised swimmer

See also
 

Yakhno
Yakhno